Midget is a term for a person of unusually short stature that is considered by some to be pejorative.

Arts, entertainment, and media
 Midget (band), a band
 Midget (novel), a novel by Tim Bowler
 The Midgets, an album by Joe Newman

Sports
 Midget car racing, a racing class of relatively small automobiles
 Midget wrestling,  wrestlers who are dwarves or people of short stature
 Midget (ice hockey), an U18 age category in minor hockey
 Midget Wolgast (1910–1955), a world flyweight boxing champion

Transportation
 Daihatsu Midget, a car
 MG Midget, a car
 Mikoyan-Gurevich MiG-15UTI, an aircraft
 Midget submarine, any submarine under 150 tons